Daniel D. Polsby (born 1945) is former dean of the law school and professor of law at Antonin Scalia Law School (George Mason University) and was previously Kirkland and Ellis Professor of Law at Northwestern University.

Education
A research fellow at The Independent Institute, Polsby is a graduate of Oakland University and the University of Minnesota Law School.  He is licensed to practice law in New York.

Scholarship and expertise
Polsby is a scholar of the right to bear arms and testified for gun rights before the United States Congress. He has also contributed to the Cato Journal, Reason Magazine, National Review. and the Atlantic Monthly.  Polsby is a member of the American Law Institute.  Polsby is often cited in regard to judicial appointments and issues. He also commented against gerrymandering and term limits. He co-developed, with Robert Popper, the Polsby–Popper test for quantifying gerrymandering.

References

External links 
 Staff profile at the George Mason University Antonin Scalia Law School

American legal scholars
Deans of law schools in the United States
University of Minnesota Law School alumni
Oakland University alumni
New York (state) lawyers
Virginia lawyers
Northwestern University faculty
1945 births
Living people